Wisconsin's 7th congressional district is a congressional district of the United States House of Representatives in northwestern and central Wisconsin; it is the largest congressional district in the state geographically, covering 20 counties (in whole or part), for a total of 18,787 sq mi. The district contains the following counties: Ashland, Barron, Bayfield, Burnett, St. Croix, Chippewa (partial), Clark, Douglas, Florence, Forest, Iron, Jackson (partial), Juneau (partial), Langlade, Lincoln, Marathon, Monroe (partial), Oneida, Polk, Price, Rusk, Sawyer, Taylor, Vilas, Washburn, and Wood (partial).

The district is currently represented by Republican Tom Tiffany.

While in 2008, the district gave 56% of the vote to Barack Obama, it has swung to the Republicans in recent presidential elections with Mitt Romney winning with 51% of the vote in 2012 and Donald Trump winning with 58% of the vote in 2016. Additionally, left-leaning Portage County (which contains the city of Stevens Point) was removed from the 7th and added to the 3rd during the hotly contested 2013 redistricting. Since these shifts, the rural 7th has surpassed the suburban 5th as the most Republican district in Wisconsin.

Agriculture is a major industry and employer in the rural 7th district. This district has been a major producer of milk from cows, grains, oilseeds, dry beans, and dry peas. 60% of the farmland in this district is used for crop production, another major economic stimulant.

Counties and municipalities within the district

Ashland County
 Ashland, Butternut, and Mellen.

Barron County
 Almena, Barron, Cameron, Chetek, Cumberland, Dallas, Haugen, Prairie Farm, Rice Lake, and Turtle Lake.

Bayfield County
 Bayfield, Mason, and Washburn.

Burnett County
 Grantsburg, Siren, and Webster.

Chippewa County
 Bloomer, Boyd, Cadott, Cornell, New Auburn, and Stanley.

Clark County
 Abbotsford (Clark County side), Colby, Curtiss, Dorchester, Granton, Greenwood, Loyal, Neillsville, Owen, Thorp, and Withee.

Douglas County
 Lake Nebagamon, Oliver, Poplar, Solon Springs, and Superior.

Florence County
 Aurora, Commonwealth, Fence, Fern, Florence, Homestead, Long Lake, and Tipler.

Forest County
 Crandon

Iron County
 Hurley and Montreal.

Jackson County
 Alma, Bear Bluff, City Point, Cleveland, Garden Valley, Knapp, and Merrillan (part).

Juneau County
 Armenia, Clearfield (most), Cutler, Finley, Germantown (half), Kingston, and Necedah.

Langlade County
 Antigo and White Lake.

Lincoln County
 Bradley and Merrill.

Marathon County
 Athens, Edgar, Elderon, Fenwood, Hatley, Marathon City, Mosinee, Rothschild, Schofield, Spencer, Stratford, Unity, and Wausau.

Monroe County
 La Grange, Lincoln, and Warrens.

Oneida County
 Rhinelander.

Polk County
 Amery, Balsam Lake, Centuria, Clayton, Clear Lake, Dresser, Frederic, Luck, Osceola, and St. Croix Falls.

Price County
 Catawba, Kennan, Park Falls, Phillips, and Prentice.

Rusk County
 Bruce, Conrath, Glen Flora, Hawkins, Ingram, Ladysmith, Sheldon, Tony, and Weyerhaeuser.

Sawyer County
 Couderay, Exeland, Hayward, Radisson, and Winter. 

St. Croix County
 Baldwin, Deer Park, Glenwood City, Hammond, Hudson, New Richmond, North Hudson, River Falls (St. Croix side), Roberts, Somerset, Spring Valley (St. Croix side), Star Prairie, Wilson, and Woodville.

Taylor County
 Gilman, Lublin, Medford, Rib Lake, and Stetsonville.

Vilas County
 Arbor Vitae, Boulder Junction, Cloverland, Conover, Eagle River, Lac du Flambeau, Land O' Lakes, Lincoln, Manitowish Waters, Phelps, Plum Lake, Presque Isle, St. Germain, and Washington.

Washburn County
 Birchwood, Minong, Shell Lake, and Spooner.

Wood County
 Arpin, Auburndale, Hewitt, Marshfield, and Pittsville.

List of members representing the district

Recent election results

2002 district boundaries (2002–2011)

2011 district boundaries (2012–2021)

Election results from recent presidential races

See also

Wisconsin's congressional districts
List of United States congressional districts

References
General

 Congressional Biographical Directory of the United States 1774–present
Specific

External links
Wisconsin's 7th Congressional District

07
Ashland County, Wisconsin
Barron County, Wisconsin
Bayfield County, Wisconsin
Burnett County, Wisconsin
Chippewa County, Wisconsin
Clark County, Wisconsin
Douglas County, Wisconsin
Iron County, Wisconsin
Langlade County, Wisconsin
Lincoln County, Wisconsin
Marathon County, Wisconsin
Polk County, Wisconsin
Price County, Wisconsin
Rusk County, Wisconsin
Sawyer County, Wisconsin
Taylor County, Wisconsin
Wood County, Wisconsin